"Unreleased Bitterness" is a single by death/doom metal band My Dying Bride. The track contained in this release is an early rehearsal recording of the song "The Bitterness and the Bereavement", which appeared on As the Flower Withers.

This 7" was released by a friend of the band with full permission on the Unbridled Voyage label. Only 1,150 copies were produced. It was pressed on a one-sided flexi disc, likely to save costs. In recent years, the manufacturer of the record revealed on the band's message board that he still had a fair few of them "in a box, under the bed", without sleeves.

Track listing
 "The Bitterness and the Bereavement"  – 7:49

Personnel
 Aaron Stainthorpe - vocals
 Andrew Craighan - guitar, bass
 Calvin Robertshaw - guitar
 Rick Miah - drums

References

1993 singles
My Dying Bride songs
Flexi discs
1993 songs